Gąski  is a village in the administrative district of Gmina Mielno, within Koszalin County, West Pomeranian Voivodeship, in north-western Poland. It is located on the Slovincian Coast.

The village has a population of 400.

Gąski is one of the most popular tourists' destination on Polish coast for its beautiful beaches and nature, aiming at sustainable development.

Nuclear power station

As a result of intense civic mobilisation, a referendum was held in February 2012, in which 94% of the citizens of Mielno voted against the building of a nuclear power station in the village of Gąski. The citizens' protest had been supported by members of two biggest parliamentary political groups (otherwise supportive for nuclear power): Civic Platform (Koszalin MP Marek Hok) and Law and Justice (Koszalin MP Czesław Hoc), as well as non-parliamentary Green Party and councillors of nearby city of Kołobrzeg. "Ecological Kołobrzeg" association also supported protests in 2012.

Despite the protests and referendum results, the Polish government still insists on the location of NPP in Gąski, although the entire Polish nuclear programme is on a 7-year delay (as of 2015). The first NPP is now planned not earlier than 2027 (the initial plan was 2020 and the government related its construction to goals of 2020 climate-energy package of the EU). In June 2016, state-owned energy company PGE EJ1 announced that it had withdrawn from the NPP project in Gąski.

Green Institute Foundation supports Gąski and Mielno to develop its own renewable energy capacity (prosumer, co-operative or communal) co-organising "Energy democracy" campaign together with Mielno authorities.

See also 

 Gąski Lighthouse

References 

Populated coastal places in Poland
Seaside resorts in Poland
Villages in Koszalin County
Nuclear power in Poland